The Leather Boys is a 1964 British drama film about the rocker subculture in London featuring a gay motorcyclist. This film is notable as an early example of a film that violated the Hollywood production code, yet was still shown in the United States, as well as an important film in the genre of queer cinema.

An example of British kitchen sink realism, it was considered daring in 1964 as it touched upon homosexuality, however obliquely. Reviewers have noted that it contains naturalistic photography, and period locations such as the Ace Cafe and the Tidal Basin Tavern in Silvertown, east London.

The film is based on a 1961 novel commissioned by the London literary agent and publisher Anthony Blond, who suggested that Gillian Freeman write about a "Romeo and Romeo in the South London suburbs".

Plot 
Working class cockney teenagers Dot (Rita Tushingham) and biker Reggie (Colin Campbell) get married. Their marriage soon turns sour. During an unsuccessful honeymoon at a holiday camp, Reggie becomes alienated from the brassy, self-absorbed Dot. Afterward, they begin to live increasingly separate lives as Reggie becomes more involved with his biker friends, especially the eccentric Pete (Dudley Sutton). Reggie also loses interest in having sex with Dot.

When Reggie's grandfather dies, Dot merely complains that his support for his bereaved grandmother (Gladys Henson) has stopped them visiting the cinema. Her boorish behaviour at the funeral and her refusal to move in with Reggie's grandmother leads to a major argument. She leaves, and Reggie stays with his grandmother, who will not leave her own house. He brings in Pete, who has been forced to leave his lodgings, to stay as a lodger with her. The two share a bed at her house. Meanwhile, Dot shows an interest in Brian (Johnny Briggs), another biker. The following day, Pete and Reggie drive to the seaside. Reggie wants them to chat up a couple of girls, but Pete shows no interest.

Reggie intends to return to Dot. Dot has hatched a plan to get him back by pretending to be pregnant. Dot is sitting with Brian when she tells Reggie of her "pregnancy". Believing he can't be the father, Reggie accuses Brian, and the two fight. Reggie knocks out Brian. Dot visits the house of Reggie's grandmother and learns that he is sharing a bed with Pete. She taunts them, calling them "queers". Reggie is disturbed by this, and asks Pete to deny that he is homosexual, but Pete avoids answering.

The bikers organise a race from London to Edinburgh and back in which Reggie, Pete and Brian all take part. Dot rides with Brian. When Brian's bike breaks down, Reggie carries Dot on his. Dot admits she is not pregnant. The two start to rekindle their relationship. When they get back, Pete manages to separate Reggie from Dot, taking him to the pub. They come back to their room drunk. When Pete passes out, Reggie sits up thinking. The following morning, he decides to return to Dot. Pete gets upset, and says he can't understand why Reggie would want to return to Dot because they get on so much better. He says they should go to America together. Reggie says that he needs a woman. He returns to Dot, but discovers her in bed with Brian. In despair, he meets with Pete and says he wishes to leave for America as soon as possible. Pete says he can get them passage working on a ship.

While Pete is arranging things, he leaves Reggie in a pub in Silvertown near the Royal docks, which turns out to be a gay pub. Reggie realises when one of the clientele starts chatting him up. When Pete enters, they all recognise him, and Reggie suddenly understands that Pete too is gay. He leaves.

Cast 
 Rita Tushingham as Dot
 Colin Campbell as Reggie
 Dudley Sutton as Pete
 Gladys Henson as Gran
 Avice Landone as Reggie's Mother
 Lockwood West as Reggie's Father
 Betty Marsden as Dot's Mother
 Martin Matthews as Uncle Arthur
 Johnny Briggs as Brian
 James Chase as Les
 Geoffrey Dunn as Mr. Lunnis
 Dandy Nichols as Mrs. Stanley
 Carmel McSharry as Bus Conductress

Production

Writing 
The book was published in 1961 under the pseudonym Eliot George—an inversion of the pen-name of the famous 19th century female author, Mary Ann Evans, who published as George Eliot. Freeman is credited under her own name in the film as the author of the screenplay based on the novel of "Eliot George". The original novel is explicit about the sexual relationship between the two male characters, and about the odds that the hero's wife is pregnant by another man. It also portrays the gang to which they belong as a criminal network, and ends with a botched robbery committed by the two main characters. The first paperback edition had a cover that featured Mike Leigh, the now famous film director, as a photographic model of one of the main characters.

The film plot was changed considerably, presumably to make it more palatable to 1964 movie-goers. Only one of the main male characters is gay in the film (with the hero Reggie leaving Pete upon finding out his sexuality at the film's end) and there is no criminal activity at all. Rita Tushingham said much of the dialogue was improvised after the actors complained that the North American director's script 'was nothing like how the youth living in London spoke at the time'.

Reception
Kinematograph Weekly called the film a "money maker" at the British box office for 1964.

References

External links 

1964 films
1964 drama films
1964 LGBT-related films
British black-and-white films
British drama films
British LGBT-related films
CinemaScope films
Films based on British novels
Films directed by Sidney J. Furie
Films set in London
LGBT-related drama films
Motorcycling films
Works published under a pseudonym
1960s English-language films
1960s British films